Kikepera Nature Reserve is a nature reserve which is located in Pärnu County, Estonia.

The area of the nature reserve is 10,733 ha.

The protected area was founded in 2007 on the basis of Kikepera Protected Area.

References

Nature reserves in Estonia
Geography of Pärnu County